"Someone Like You" is a single released by New Order in December 2001. The single is unusual in New Order's back catalogue in the respect that it was issued primarily as a club DJ vinyl release. "Someone Like You" was remixed by Futureshock, Gabriel & Dresden, James Holden and Funk D'void. The Gabriel & Dresden 911 Vocal Mix was recorded on September 11 and all releases with its inclusion have these sleeve notes: "Recorded September 11th, 2001 and is dedicated to the men, women and children who senselessly lost their lives that day". The original album mix of the song was featured in Bam Margera's film Haggard and included on its CD soundtrack.

Track listing

Chart positions

References

2001 singles
New Order (band) songs
Songs written by Bernard Sumner
Songs written by Peter Hook
Songs written by Stephen Morris (musician)
Songs written by Gillian Gilbert
2001 songs
London Records singles